Princess Elizabeth Charlotte Alexandra Mary Louise of Hesse-Kassel (13 June 1861 – 7 June 1955), was a Princess of Hesse-Kassel by birth and, by her marriage to Leopold, Hereditary Prince of Anhalt, the Hereditary Princess of Anhalt.

Early life 
Elisabeth was born in Copenhagen, the daughter of Prince Frederick William of Hesse-Kassel and Princess Anna of Prussia, a granddaughter of Frederick William III, King of Prussia. She was the couple's second child and eldest daughter.

Biography 
Elisabeth was considered as a possible bride of Leopold, Duke of Albany, the fourth son of Queen Victoria. It was said that Leopold was eager to meet Elisabeth based on news of her good reputation.  While the two met in November 1879, no marriage plans materialized.

Elisabeth became engaged in December 1883 to Leopold, Hereditary Prince of Anhalt. Leopold was the heir to the Duchy of Anhalt-Dessau and the son of Frederick I, Duke of Anhalt, and Princess Antoinette of Saxe-Altenburg. On 26 May 1884, the couple married in a lavish ceremony at Philippsruhe Castle in Hanau. A commemorative medal was issued for the occasion, as was common with royal marriages in the Duchy of Anhalt.

Leopold and Elisabeth had one child:
 Princess Antoinette of Anhalt (Schloss Georgium, 3 March 1885 – Dessau, 3 April 1963), married on 26 May 1909 to Prince Frederick of Schaumburg-Lippe.
Leopold died suddenly in Cannes, France, on 2 February 1886. (Coincidentally, Elisabeth's former suitor Leopold of Albany had also died suddenly in Cannes in 1884.) Antoinette was not eligible to succeed her father as the Hereditary Princess of Anhalt due to the Salic Law, so Leopold's claim was inherited by his younger brother, the future Frederick II, Duke of Anhalt. Elisabeth never remarried and survived her husband by nearly 70 years. She died in Dessau 7 June 1955, less than a week before her 94th birthday. She is buried in Dessau.

Ancestry

References

1861 births
1955 deaths
Princesses of Hesse
House of Hesse-Kassel